In computer science, the maximum sum subarray problem, also known as the maximum segment sum problem, is the task of finding a contiguous subarray with the largest sum, within a given one-dimensional array A[1...n] of numbers. It can be solved in  time and  space.

 
is as large as possible. (Some formulations of the problem also allow the empty subarray to be considered; by convention, the sum of all values of the empty subarray is zero.)  Each number in the input array A could be positive, negative, or zero.

For example, for the array of values [−2, 1, −3, 4, −1, 2, 1, −5, 4], the contiguous subarray with the largest sum is [4, −1, 2, 1], with sum 6.

Some properties of this problem are: 
 If the array contains all non-negative numbers, then the problem is trivial; a maximum subarray is the entire array.
 If the array contains all non-positive numbers, then a solution is any subarray of size 1 containing the maximal value of the array (or the empty subarray, if it is permitted).
 Several different sub-arrays may have the same maximum sum.

Although this problem can be solved using several different algorithmic techniques, including brute force, divide and conquer, dynamic programming, and reduction to shortest paths, a simple single-pass algorithm known as Kadane's algorithm solves it efficiently.

History 
The maximum subarray problem was proposed by Ulf Grenander in 1977 as a simplified model for maximum likelihood estimation of patterns in digitized images.

Grenander was looking to find a rectangular subarray with maximum sum, in a two-dimensional array of real numbers.  A brute-force algorithm for the two-dimensional problem runs in O(n6) time; because this was prohibitively slow, Grenander proposed the one-dimensional problem to gain insight into its structure.  Grenander derived an algorithm that solves the one-dimensional problem in O(n2) time,
improving the brute force running time of O(n3). When Michael Shamos heard about the problem, he overnight devised an O(n log n) divide-and-conquer algorithm for it.
Soon after, Shamos described the one-dimensional problem and its history at a Carnegie Mellon University seminar attended by Jay Kadane, who designed within a minute an O(n)-time algorithm, which is as fast as possible. In 1982, David Gries obtained the same O(n)-time algorithm by applying Dijkstra's "standard strategy"; in 1989, Richard Bird derived it by purely algebraic manipulation of the brute-force algorithm using the Bird–Meertens formalism.

Grenander's two-dimensional generalization can be solved in O(n3) time either by using Kadane's algorithm as a subroutine, or through a divide-and-conquer approach. There is some evidence that no significantly faster algorithm exists; an algorithm that solves the two-dimensional maximum subarray problem in O(n3−ε) time, for any ε>0, would imply a similarly fast algorithm for the all-pairs shortest paths problem.

Applications 

Maximum subarray problems arise in many fields, such as genomic sequence analysis and computer vision.

Genomic sequence analysis employs maximum subarray algorithms to identify important biological segments of protein sequences. These problems include conserved segments, GC-rich regions, tandem repeats, low-complexity filter, DNA binding domains, and regions of high charge.

In computer vision, maximum-subarray algorithms are used on bitmap images to detect the brightest area in an image.

Kadane's algorithm

Empty subarrays admitted

Kadane's original algorithm solves the problem version when empty subarrays are admitted. It scans the given array  from left to right. 
and easily obtained as the maximum of all values of current_sum seen so far, cf. line 7 of the algorithm.

As a loop invariant, in the th step, the old value of current_sum holds the maximum over all  of the sum .
Therefore, current_sum
is the maximum over all  of the sum . To extend the latter maximum to cover also the case , it is sufficient to consider also the empty subarray . This is done in line 6 by assigning current_sum as the new value of current_sum, which after that holds the maximum over all  of the sum .

Thus, the problem can be solved with the following code, expressed here in Python:

def max_subarray(numbers):
    """Find the largest sum of any contiguous subarray."""
    best_sum = 0
    current_sum = 0
    for x in numbers:
        current_sum = max(0, current_sum + x)
        best_sum = max(best_sum, current_sum)
    return best_sum

This version of the algorithm will return 0 if the input contains no positive elements (including when the input is empty).

The algorithm can be adapted to the case which disallows empty subarrays or to keep track of the starting and ending indices of the maximum subarray.

This algorithm calculates the maximum subarray ending at each position from the maximum subarray ending at the previous position, so it can be viewed as a trivial case of dynamic programming.

Complexity

Generalizations 
Similar problems may be posed for higher-dimensional arrays, but their solutions are more complicated; see, e.g., .  showed how to find the k largest subarray sums in a one-dimensional array, in the optimal time bound .

The Maximum sum k-disjoint subarrays can also be computed in the optimal time bound  
.

See also 
 Subset sum problem

Notes

References

.

.

.

External links 
 
 
 
 www.algorithmist.com
 alexeigor.wikidot.com
 greatest subsequential sum problem on Rosetta Code
 geeksforgeeks page on Kadane's Algorithm

Optimization algorithms and methods
Dynamic programming
Articles with example Python (programming language) code